Our Lady of Philermos (also Phileremos, Philerme, Filerimos;) is a Byzantine icon of the Theotokos, dated to the 11th or 12th century. Originally kept at Phileremos Monastery in Rhodes and then in Malta, the icon has long been venerated as the patroness of the Knights Hospitaller and the Sovereign Military Order of Malta. It is now kept in the Museum of Art and History in Cetinje, Montenegro.

The icon is tempera on wood, 44 by 36 cm. It depicts just the head of the Virgin Mary. Her face is seen in three-quarters profile, slightly inclined towards her left shoulder. The face is oval with a long nose in the Byzantine style.

The icon was kept at Phileremos Monastery, Rhodes, presumably since the 12th century, although it was often said to have been brought to Rhodes from the Holy Land. It was captured by the Knights Hospitaller in their conquest of Rhodes in 1306/1310. Her fame is due to miracles attributed to her intercession, primarily in the Siege of Rhodes (1480). After the loss of Rhodes in 1522, the icon was rescued, and attached to the mainmast of the Santa Maria, a carrack captured from the Sultan of Egypt in 1507, during the Order's years of exile.

When the Order was given possession of Malta in 1530, the icon was held at the Church of St. Lawrence in their headquarters in Vittoriosa. When the Order moved its base to the newly built capital city of Valletta in the 1570s, the icon was housed at a purpose-built side chapel of Saint John's Co-Cathedral. The icon remained there until the French invasion of Malta in 1798 which expelled the Order from the Maltese Islands. The French allowed the Order to take some relics with them, but not their precious reliquaries. The icon together with a fragment of the True Cross and of the hand of John the Baptist were passed by admiral Giulio Renato Litta to Paul I of Russia, who succeeded Ferdinand von Hompesch zu Bolheim as Grand Master. Paul placed them in the Priory Palace at Gatchina, near St. Petersburg.

In Russia, the icon was again covered in a riza of gold and precious stones. The riza includes a horseshoe-shaped diadem with rubies and diamonds,  two necklaces of sapphire and diamond, and a halo  in the form of the Maltese cross, the eight points shown as protruding from behind the head of the Virgin. Tsar Nicholas I ordered a copy to be made, to be carried in processions due to the fragile state of the original. This copy is now kept in the Papal Basilica of Saint Mary of the Angels in Assisi.

The relics survived the October Revolution, and were brought out of Soviet Russia by Maria Feodorovna in 1920, via Copenhagen. Her daughters gave it to Archbishop Anthony, president of the synod of the Russian Orthodox Church in exile. They were transferred to Belgrade in 1932 and placed under the protection of Alexander I of Yugoslavia, kept in the chapel of St Andrew in the royal palace at Dedinje until 1941. It appears that under the threat of Nazi invasion, they were moved to Ostrog Monastery in Montenegro.

In 1951, a detachment of Yugoslav special forces captured the relics, and they were secretly placed in the vault of the museum at Cetinje. Their presence there was publicly revealed only in 1993, on the occasion of the visit of Russian patriarch Alexis II of Moscow.

References 

Jean-Bernard de Vaivre, Laurent Vissière, "Afin que vous entendez mon intencion des ystoires que je vueil, et des lieux où seront", Société de l'histoire et du patrimoine de l'ordre de Malte 27 (2012), 4–106.
Giovannella Ferraris di Celle, La Madonna del Filermo, Verona, 1988.
Giovannella Ferraris di Celle, La Panaghia tes Phileremou, Rome,  2001.

External links

Our Lady of Philerme (smom-za.org)
Σύναξη της Παναγίας της Φιλερήμου στην Ρόδο (saint.gr)

Knights Hospitaller
Sovereign Military Order of Malta
Eastern Orthodox icons of the Virgin Mary
Byzantine icons
Medieval Rhodes